The High Commissioner of Malaysia to New Zealand is the head of Malaysia's diplomatic mission to New Zealand. The position has the rank and status of an Ambassador Extraordinary and Plenipotentiary and is based in the High Commission of Malaysia, Wellington.

List of heads of mission

High Commissioners to New Zealand

See also
 Malaysia–New Zealand relations

References 

 
New Zealand
Malaysia